Clifton Reece Gaines (born January 7, 1981) is an American former professional basketball player and former assistant coach at Austin Spurs. He is currently a video coordinator for Louisville.

High school and college career

Gaines, a 6'6", 205 lb (1.98 m, 93 kg) shooting guard, played high school basketball at Madison West in his hometown of Madison, Wisconsin. He then played four years at University of Louisville, earning AP All-America 3rd team honors his senior season while leading the Cardinals to a 25–7 win–loss record. He's considered one of the best all-time shooting guards for the Louisville Cardinal basketball program. He ranks among the top-five Louisville leaders in made three-point field goals (225), free throws (456), and assists (475). Dwyane Wade of the Miami Heat once called Reece Gaines "the best college basketball player he ever faced".

NBA career

Gaines was drafted by the Orlando Magic in the first round (15th overall) of the 2003 NBA draft and signed with the club on July 18, 2003. He spent one season on the bench in Orlando (1.8 points, 1.0 rebounds, 1.1 assists in 38 games) before being traded to the Houston Rockets (along with Tracy McGrady, Juwan Howard and Tyronn Lue) in exchange for Steve Francis, Cuttino Mobley and Kelvin Cato.

Gaines played ten games with the Rockets (2.6 points, 1.1 rebounds, 0.3 assists per game), spending the majority of his time on the injured list. He was traded again on February 24, 2005 (with two future second-round picks) to the Milwaukee Bucks for Mike James and Zendon Hamilton. Gaines saw even less playing time with the Bucks during the second half of the 2004–05 season, playing a total of 79 minutes (1.4 points, 0.3 rebounds, 0.4 assists) in 11 games. Gaines's playing time decreased even more with the Bucks in the 2005–06 season, appearing in 12 games, and playing 52 minutes (1.1 points, no rebounds, 0.3 assists).

Gaines' final NBA game was played on February 12, 2006, in a 79 - 94 loss to the New Jersey Nets where he recorded 2 assists and 1 steal.

NBA career statistics

Regular season

|-
| align="left" | 2003–04
| align="left" | Orlando
| 38 || 1 || 9.6 || .291 || .300 || .640 || 1.0 || 1.1 || 0.3 || 0.1 || 1.8
|-
| align="left" | 2004–05
| align="left" | Houston
| 10 || 0 || 10.8 || .370 || .250 || .750 || 1.1 || 0.3 || 0.3 || 0.0 || 2.6
|-
| align="left" | 2004–05
| align="left" | Milwaukee
| 11 || 0 || 7.2 || .304 || .500 || .000 || 0.3 || 0.4 || 0.2 || 0.1 || 1.4
|-
| align="left" | 2005–06
| align="left" | Milwaukee
| 12 || 0 || 4.5 || .500 || .000 || .250 || 0.0 || 0.3 || 0.1 || 0.0 || 1.1
|- class="sortbottom"
| style="text-align:center;" colspan="2"| Career
| 71 || 1 || 8.5 || .324 || .269 || .606 || 0.7 || 0.7 || 0.2 || 0.0 || 1.7
|}

International career

In 2006, he moved to Italy where he played for Angelico Biella, Armani Jeans Milano and Benetton Treviso. In 2009, he joined the Bakersfield Jam, with whom he averaged 14.3 points and 4.0 assists per game. In December 2010 he signed with JA Vichy in France. In January 2012 Gaines signed a 30-day contract with the Fürstenfeld Panthers in Austria. On February 2, 2012, the Panthers announced that the contract with Gaines would not be extended.

Coaching career

In 2012, Gaines was hired as an assistant coach at Bellarmine University, where he coached for three seasons.  While at Bellarmine, he helped the Knights to three straight NCAA Division II Tournament appearances, including a Sweet 16 and a Final Four trip.

In 2015, Gaines became an assistant coach at Eastern Kentucky University.  In 2018, Gaines was named acting coach after Head Coach Dan McHale's contract was terminated.

On November 5, 2019, the Austin Spurs announced that they had named Gaines as assistant coach.

References

External links
NBA.com Profile – Reece Gaines
https://web.archive.org/web/20060712103208/http://www.sportsstats.com/jazzyj/greats/03/gaines.htm
NBA D-League Profile – Reece Gaines

1981 births
Living people
African-American basketball players
All-American college men's basketball players
American expatriate basketball people in Austria
American expatriate basketball people in France
American expatriate basketball people in Greece
American expatriate basketball people in Italy
American expatriate basketball people in Spain
American expatriate basketball people in Venezuela
American men's basketball players
Austin Spurs coaches
Bakersfield Jam players
Basketball coaches from Wisconsin
Basketball players from Wisconsin
BSC Fürstenfeld Panthers players
Bellarmine Knights men's basketball coaches
CB Granada players
Eastern Kentucky Colonels men's basketball coaches
Greek Basket League players
Houston Rockets players
JA Vichy players
Louisville Cardinals men's basketball players
Milwaukee Bucks players
Olimpia Milano players
Orlando Magic draft picks
Orlando Magic players
Pallacanestro Biella players
Pallacanestro Treviso players
Peristeri B.C. players
Point guards
Sportspeople from Madison, Wisconsin
Texas Legends players
Madison West High School alumni
21st-century African-American sportspeople
20th-century African-American people